Elmer is a given name and surname.

Elmer may also refer to:

Places
In the United Kingdom:
 Elmer, West Sussex

In the United States:
 Elmer Township, Oscoda County, Michigan
 Elmer Township, Sanilac County, Michigan
 Elmer, Minnesota
 Elmer Township, Pipestone County, Minnesota
 Elmer Township, St. Louis County, Minnesota
 Elmer, Missouri
 Elmer, New Jersey
 Elmer, Oklahoma

Other uses
Elmer (crater), a crater on the moon
Elmer (comics), a Filipino comic by Gerry Alanguilan
Elmer (ham radio), an established radio amateur who helps newcomers
Elmer (robot), an educational robot built by W. Grey Walter
Elmer's Products, Inc., makers of Elmer's Glue-All and other glues in the United States
Elmer FEM solver, an open-source Finite Element Method tool
Elmer the Patchwork Elephant, a children's book by David McKee
ELMER guidelines, for public forms on the Internet
El Morocco or Elmer, a  former nightclub in New York City
Aylmer, or Elmer, the monster in the film Brain Damage

See also
 Elmer Food Beat, a Breton rock group
Elmer Fudd, a Looney Tunes fictional character, archenemy of Bugs Bunny
PerkinElmer, an American technology company
Aylmer, a surname